The Clarissine Church (Slovak: Kostol Povýšenia svätého Kríža, known as Kostol klarisiek) is a gothic church, part of a complex of medieval buildings forming the former Convent of Poor Clares in the Old Town of Bratislava, the capital of Slovakia. The former Catholic church is owned by the city of Bratislava and it is used for cultural events. The church is a notable example of Gothic architecture in Slovakia.

History and appearance
The nuns of the Poor Clares order came to Bratislava in 1297 and built a church and a convent with the support of the king. In 1782 the Order of Poor Clares was dissolved, and the church became the seat of a legal academy and school. It is currently used as a concert and exhibition hall.

A pentagonal tower was added in the 15th Century.

The Order of Poor Clares was dissolved in the Kingdom of Hungary in 1782 by the decree of Joseph II, Holy Roman Emperor. There are also Clarissine churches in Bamberg, Brixen, and Nuremberg.

See also
 History of Bratislava

References

15th-century churches in Slovakia
Gothic architecture in Slovakia
Buildings and structures in Bratislava